Cycle Force Group, also known as Cycle Force, is an American bicycle and bicycle accessories importer. The company was established in 1998 by Nyle Nims as a service center and agent office for a group of Asian component makers and bicycle manufacturers in Taiwan. Cycle Force licenses rights to many internationally known name brands for sale on bicycles and related products.

Nyle Nims, the current President of Cycle Force, was President of Ross Bicycles from 1987 to 1998, and is also the President of the Bicycle Products Suppliers Association from 2000 to 2002.

Cycle Force has Mantis as its own in-house brand, Cycle Force imports bicycles under the following licensed brands;

 G.I. Joe: The Rise of Cobra
 Kawasaki
 Hollandia – a European city bike
 Mantis – Children's bikes
 NASCAR
 Piranha (children's bikes)
 Polaris
 Spider-Man
 Smith & Wesson (police bikes)
 Tour de France
 Transformers: Revenge of the Fallen
 Victory
 Volkswagen
 KHEbikes

Cycle Force is the sole US importer of Head, and Lombardo bikes.

References

External links
 Cycle Force Official Site 
 Mantis Bikes
 Hollandia

Road cycles
Cycle manufacturers of the United States